In classical Euclidean geometry, a point is a primitive notion that models an exact location in space, and has no length, width, or thickness. In modern mathematics, a point refers more generally to an element of some set called a space.

Being a primitive notion means that a point cannot be defined in terms of previously defined objects. That is, a point is defined only by some properties, called axioms, that it must satisfy; for example, "there is exactly one line that passes through two different points".

Points in Euclidean geometry

Points, considered within the framework of Euclidean geometry, are one of the most fundamental objects. Euclid originally defined the point as "that which has no part". Further generalizations are represented by an ordered tuplet of  terms,  where  is the dimension of the space in which the point is located.

Many constructs within Euclidean geometry consist of an infinite collection of points that conform to certain axioms.  This is usually represented by a set of points; As an example, a line is an infinite set of points of the form
Similar constructions exist that define the plane, line segment, and other related concepts. A line segment consisting of only a single point is called a degenerate line segment.

In addition to defining points and constructs related to points, Euclid also postulated a key idea about points, that any two points can be connected by a straight line. This is easily confirmed under modern extensions of Euclidean geometry, and had lasting consequences at its introduction, allowing the construction of almost all the geometric concepts known at the time. However, Euclid's postulation of points was neither complete nor definitive, and he occasionally assumed facts about points that did not follow directly from his axioms, such as the ordering of points on the line or the existence of specific points. In spite of this, modern expansions of the system serve to remove these assumptions.

Dimension of a point

There are several inequivalent definitions of dimension  in mathematics. In all of the common definitions, a point is 0-dimensional.

Vector space dimension 

The dimension of a vector space is the maximum size of a linearly independent subset. In a vector space consisting of a single point (which must be the zero vector 0), there is no linearly independent subset. The zero vector is not itself linearly independent, because there is a non-trivial linear combination making it zero: .

Topological dimension

If no such minimal n exists, the space is said to be of infinite covering dimension.

A point is zero-dimensional with respect to the covering dimension because every open cover of the space has a refinement consisting of a single open set.

Hausdorff dimension 
Let X be a metric space. If S ⊂ X and d ∈ [0, ∞), the d-dimensional Hausdorff content of S is the infimum of the set of numbers δ ≥ 0 such that there is some (indexed) collection of balls  covering S with ri > 0 for each i ∈ I that satisfies 

The Hausdorff dimension of X is defined by

A point has Hausdorff dimension 0 because it can be covered by a single ball of arbitrarily small radius.

Geometry without points
Although the notion of a point is generally considered fundamental in mainstream geometry and topology, there are some systems that forgo it, e.g. noncommutative geometry and pointless topology. A "pointless" or "pointfree" space is defined not as a set, but via some structure (algebraic or logical respectively) which looks like a well-known function space on the set: an algebra of continuous functions or an algebra of sets respectively. More precisely, such structures generalize well-known spaces of functions in a way that the operation "take a value at this point" may not be defined. A further tradition starts from some books of A. N. Whitehead in which the notion of region is assumed as a primitive together with the one of inclusion or connection.

Point masses and the Dirac delta function 

Often in physics and mathematics, it is useful to think of a point as having non-zero mass or charge (this is especially common in classical electromagnetism, where electrons are idealized as points with non-zero charge). The Dirac delta function, or  function, is (informally) a generalized function on the real number line that is zero everywhere except at zero, with an integral of one over the entire real line. The delta function is sometimes thought of as an infinitely high, infinitely thin spike at the origin, with total area one under the spike, and physically represents an idealized point mass or point charge. It was introduced by theoretical physicist Paul Dirac.  In the context of signal processing it is often referred to as the unit impulse symbol (or function). Its discrete analog is the Kronecker delta function which is usually defined on a finite domain and takes values 0 and 1.

See also

Accumulation point
Affine space
Boundary point
Critical point
Cusp
Foundations of geometry
Position (geometry)
Point cloud
Point process
Point set registration
Pointwise
Singular point of a curve
Whitehead point-free geometry

Notes

References

 

. 2004 paperback, Prometheus Books. Being the 1919 Tarner Lectures delivered at Trinity College.

External links